Wynns or Wynn's can refer to:

Businesses
Wynn's, subsidiary of Illinois Tool Works
Wynns (wine), Australian winery

People
Austin Wynns (born 1990), American baseball player
Jill Wynns, American politician
Mahala Wynns (born 1948), Turks and Caicos Islands politician
Thomas Wynns (1764–1825), American politician

See also
Wynn (disambiguation)